A Feast for Crows is the second full-length studio album released by the Christian metal band Corpus Christi.  The album was released by Victory Records on July 6, 2010. It hosts a whole new lineup, aside from the only remaining member of the band previously, the rhythm guitarist and clean vocalist, Jarrod Christman. This includes Andrew Poling on drums, Caleb Rhodes on bass, Derek Ayres on lead guitar, and the harsh vocals of Max O'Connell. The album features a new sound different from The Darker Shades of White, sounding similar to bands such as Bury Your Dead. Corpus Christi is currently promoting the album on tour with bands like Divide the Sea, Judges, Thoughts In Reverse, and With Words.

Track listing

Personnel
Andrew Poling – drums
Jarrod Christman – rhythm guitar, clean vocals
Caleb Rhoads – bass
Derek Ayres – lead guitar
Max O'Connell – harsh vocals

References

External links 
Corpus Christi Official Myspace
Corpus Christi on Victory Records

2010 albums
Corpus Christi (band) albums
Victory Records albums